John Scrimgeour or Scrymgeour may refer to:
 John Scrimgeour (minister), Scottish Presbyterian minister
 John Scrimgeour of Myres, Scottish architect
 John Scrimgeour (Canadian politician), Scottish-born farmer and political figure in Prince Edward Island
 John Scrymgeour, 1st Earl of Dundee, Scottish soldier
 John Scrymgeour, 1st Viscount of Dudhope, Scottish politician